Elisabeth Holm is an American film producer and screenwriter. She produced the 2014 film Obvious Child and was formerly the film program director at Kickstarter.

Career
For three years, Holm was the film program director at the crowdfunding website Kickstarter, a role in which she helped potential filmmakers to source funding for their projects. She was involved in curating films, writing editorials, overseeing events, and liaising with filmmakers who used the website. She helped to organize and host the Kickstarter Film Festival.

Holm was an associate producer of Paradise Lost 3: Purgatory (2011), the third film in a documentary series about the West Memphis Three by Joe Berlinger and Bruce Sinofsky. She produced Welcome to Pine Hill (2012), an independent drama film, and Sailing a Sinking Sea (2015), a documentary about the Moken people in Thailand and Burma.

In 2011, Holm met filmmaker Gillian Robespierre, who at the time was creating a feature film, Obvious Child, based on a 2009 short film she had previously made. Holm agreed to produce the film and also worked with Robespierre to develop the script. Part of the film's financing came from a Kickstarter campaign; Holm used her experience working there to help organize and promote the film's campaign. The final film was released in 2014. Holm won the 2014 Sundance Film Festival Red Crown Producer's Award for her work.

Holm and Robespierre co-wrote the film Landline, which premiered at the 2017 Sundance Film Festival. They have also co-written and executive produced a television pilot for FX. The show is about two filmmakers, played by Jenny Slate and Ari Graynor, who embark on a road trip together.

In 2015, she was named one of Forbes magazine's "30 Under 30" in the "Hollywood & Entertainment" category. She is a member of the Independent Filmmaker Project and New York Women in Film & Television.

In 2022, she co-wrote the story of Marcel the Shell with Shoes On alongside Dean Fleischer Camp, Jenny Slate and Nick Paley, as well as produced, for which she was nominated for the Academy Award for Best Animated Feature at the 95th Academy Awards.

Personal life
Holm was born and raised in New York.

Filmography

References

External links

21st-century American women
American film producers
American women film producers
American women screenwriters
Annie Award winners
Living people
People from New York (state)
Screenwriters from New York (state)
Year of birth missing (living people)